Agalloch was an American extreme metal band from Portland, Oregon. Formed in 1995 by frontman John Haughm, they released five full-length albums, four EPs, two singles, one split single, two demos, four compilation albums and one live video album. They announced their disbandment in May 2016.

History

Formation and early years (1995–1997)

Named after the resinous wood of the agarwood (Aquilaria agallocha), Agalloch began as the creation of Haughm and keyboardist Shane Breyer. In early 1996, the duo began composing material. Guitarist Don Anderson joined the band that summer to further refine the songs, which were recorded that autumn for release as the band's first demo tape, From Which of This Oak. This recording displayed a significant black metal influence and included material which would later appear on subsequent albums in one form or another. Shortly after the recording, bassist Jason William Walton was added to the lineup.

Pale Folklore and Of Stone, Wind, and Pillor (1998–2001)
In 1998, the trio recorded a new demo tape, Promo 1998, solely for labels. It caught the attention of The End Records, who offered them a contract, resulting in the 1999 release of their debut full-length album, Pale Folklore. Reworking several earlier demo tracks, the album featured less of a black metal influence, more neofolk elements and neoclassical interludes. After the recording was completed, Breyer departed the band due to a lack of interest in music.

After a hiatus, the band released an EP of unreleased material from 1998–2001 titled Of Stone, Wind, and Pillor, revealing more neoclassical and experimental elements. The EP also included a cover of "Kneel to the Cross" by neofolk band Sol Invictus that would later be released on Sol Lucet Omnibus, French label Cynerfierrd's tribute compilation to Sol Invictus.

The Mantle (2002–2005)
During the 2001 to early 2002 period, Agalloch recorded The Mantle, featuring more of a post-rock influence. The album's sleeve art featured photographs of public statues and fountains found in downtown Portland. This album marked a change in media attention for Agalloch, landing them interviews with mainstream magazines.

Following the release of The Mantle, Agalloch played their first show on March 6, 2003 in Portland, followed by a few additional shows in March and a US West Coast tour in May.

Two subsequent records, the Tomorrow Will Never Come 7" single (issued by The End's Infinite Vinyl Series in 2003) and The Grey (released by Vendlus Records in 2004), showcased an even more experimental side of Agalloch, featuring remixed and reworked versions of songs from The Mantle as well as a new post-rock-influenced title track on the B-side of Tomorrow Will Never Come. Agalloch performed a series of shows on the North American East Coast in 2004.

A nature-themed split 10" picture disc single with the Finnish band Nest was also released in 2004, showcasing a collaborative, neofolk effort by Agalloch on the A-side. The Nest track, a more electronic, percussion-heavy effort, included vocal and guitar contributions by Haughm and Anderson.

Double vinyl reissues of The Mantle and Pale Folklore were released in 2005 in limited wooden boxes, complete with new artwork for both albums, to commemorate the band's single live performance of 2005 at the Day of the Equinox music festival held in Toronto on October 14, 2005.

Ashes Against the Grain and The White (2006–2008)
Ashes Against the Grain, the band's third full-length album, was released on August 8, 2006 by The End Records, featuring less focus on The Mantle'''s prominent acoustic guitars and more emphasis on electric guitars and metal elements, giving the album a different sound than their previous releases.

On previous albums, Haughm had played drums, but wished to concentrate more on songwriting and guitar, so Chris Greene (who had joined the band for live shows beginning in 2003) played drums on all Ashes Against the Grain tracks except "Falling Snow" and "Not Unlike the Waves." After a 2006 European tour, Greene exited the band, replaced by Aesop Dekker of Ludicra.Ashes Against the Grain completed the band's contract with The End Records, and in April 2008, Agalloch decided against renewing the contract.

On February 29, 2008, Agalloch released The White, the second half (and stylistic opposite) of their two-part EP release for Vendlus. As with The Grey, the album was limited to 2,000 copies. The White collected dark folk/ambient work from 2004–2007, with a sound more akin to the acoustic guitar approach of The Mantle. The tracks "The Isle of Summer", "Sowilo Rune" and "Summerisle Reprise" were based on themes from the 1973 film The Wicker Man, with all three tracks utilizing samples from the film. The track "Birch White" borrowed its lyrics from a song by A.S.J. Tessimond titled "Birch Tree". "Sowilo Rune" was posted on Agalloch's official MySpace page roughly two months before the album was released.

The Demonstration Archive and Marrow of the Spirit (2008–2013)
On August 4, 2008, Agalloch released a compilation album called The Demonstration Archive 1996–1998 on Licht von Dämmerung Arthouse, collecting material recorded between 1996 and 1998 including the From Which of This Oak and Promo 1998 demos and the then-unreleased Of Stone, Wind, and Pillor EP.

On August 12, 2009, From Which of This Oak was re-released as a picture disk by German label Eisenwald Tonschmiede.

Agalloch recorded a track, "Nebelmeer", with German artist Mathias Grassow for the compilation album Der Wanderer über dem Nebelmeer (English: "Wanderer Above the Sea of Fog") released by Pest Productions in March 2010.

A two-CD compilation album named The Compendium Archive 1996 – 2006 was released by Licht von Dämmerung Arthouse on March 20, 2010, limited to 250 copies. The album was intended to be sold exclusively at two shows played by the band in Romania during March 2010; however, 85 unsold copies were subsequently sold on eBay by the band during May 2010. Disc one was an exact copy of The Demonstration Archive, while disc two contained material recorded during the 2000–2006 period and previously released on Of Stone, Wind, and Pillor, Tomorrow Will Never Come and the split with Nest, as well as alternate versions of tracks from The Mantle and Ashes Against the Grain and some previously unreleased tracks.

On June 7, 2010, Agalloch posted a blog entry on MySpace stating that the fourth album would be released on the Canadian record label Profound Lore Records, which had also released the first two Agalloch albums on vinyl in 2005. The band stated that the album would be recorded throughout June and July 2010 but did not list the album's title or release date.

On September 21, 2010, Agalloch officially announced the title of their fourth full-length as Marrow of the Spirit. The album was released in mid-November on Profound Lore.

In an interview with Exclaim! magazine, in regards to the production of Marrow of the Spirit, Haughm stated, “We wanted an album that sounded more alive and real....Our last album was a bit too mechanized, too polished, and that kind of disturbed us. So we brought back the older methods that we had utilized on our demos and first album to try and get back a more organic feeling.”

A tour-only edition of Marrow of the Spirit was issued by Licht von Dämmerung/Profound Lore, including a CD, photo cards and a bonus 7" featuring two tracks: "Nihil Totem" and "The Weight of Darkness".

On June 26, 2012, Agalloch released the Faustian Echoes EP on Licht von Dämmerung Arthouse, consisting of just one 21-minute-long song (the longest song Agalloch has ever written). Agalloch toured North America in July and August 2012 to support the release.

The Serpent & the Sphere, new single and band split (2013–2016)
On October 13, 2013, Agalloch stated that they have "a new album in the works". On January 31, 2014, the band announced that The Serpent & the Sphere would be released on May 13 by Profound Lore. Following the US release, it was issued in Germany on May 16 and Europe on May 19. The album featured guest Nathanaël Larochette of Musk Ox on acoustic guitar. Also on May 16, Licht von Dämmerung Arthouse released a 7" vinyl single of album track "Alpha Serpentis (Unukalhai)", credited to Agalloch and Nathanaël Larochette and limited to 350 copies.

On May 13, 2016, Agalloch announced that they had disbanded. The announcement came in the form of a Facebook post on the band's official page:
Following 20 years, 5 full-length albums, many tours around the world, and numerous other recordings, John Haughm and the rest of the band (Don Anderson, Jason Walton, and Aesop Dekker) have parted ways. What the future holds for the separate parties remains undetermined. We collectively thank all of our fans across the world. There are also way too many other people to thank who made this band possible. You know who you are.

On September 16th, 2016, Haughm announced the formation of a new band called Pillorian, while Anderson, Walton and Dekker began a new project called Khôrada with vocalist Aaron John Gregory of Giant Squid. Pillorian's debut album, Obsidian Arc, was released on March 10, 2017. Khôrada's debut album, Salt, was released on July 20, 2018.

Style
Agalloch performed a progressive and avant-garde style of folk metal that encompassed an eclectic range of tendencies including neofolk, post-rock, black metal and doom metal.

Common themes in Agalloch's imagery and subject matter were the beauty of nature, winter, melancholy and allusions to ancestral paganism. Don Anderson described Norse mythology as a major influence on the band and said that "heathen culture" was the main inspiration for frontman John Haughm in particular. Anderson said that the band's take on Ralph Waldo Emerson's philosophy could be viewed as a kind of worship of nature, but that no one in the band practiced paganism as a religion.

Agalloch also used non-traditional instruments, such as a deer skull. In the song "The Lodge", Haughm struck the deer skull to create an unusual clicking sound.

In a 1999 Wicked World interview with Haughm and Walton, done by Dan Tobin, the band members listed influences including Katatonia, Ulver, The 3rd and the Mortal, Swans and Godspeed You! Black Emperor. In another interview with the Metal Rules webzine, the band cited filmmakers such as Alejandro Jodorowsky, Jim Jarmusch and Ingmar Bergman as influences. They have also referenced literary works, as on Faustian Echoes''. In another interview, John lists Bethlehem, Fields Of The Nephilim, Coil, Arvo Pärt, Death In June, Steve Reich, and Joy Division as influences. He also says that Rush is his "favorite band in the world".

Members

 Final line-up
 John Haughm − vocals, guitar, drums (formerly of Sculptured) (1995–2016)
 Don Anderson − guitar, keyboards (Sculptured, Nothing, formerly of Darling, formerly of Necropolis) (1996–2016)
 Jason William Walton − bass guitar (Especially Likely Sloth, formerly of Subterranean Masquerade, Sculptured, Nothing, formerly of Susurrus Inanis) (1997–2016)
 Aesop Dekker − drums (formerly of Ludicra, Worm Ouroboros, VHÖL) (2007–2016)

 Former
 Shane Breyer − keyboards (formerly of Susurrus Inanis) (1996–1998)
 Chris Greene − drums (2004–2007)

 Timeline

Discography

Studio albums

EPs

References

External links 

 Interview With Agalloch By Dan Tobin
 Agalloch at Encyclopaedia Metallum

American folk metal musical groups
Heavy metal musical groups from Oregon
Musical groups established in 1995
Musical groups disestablished in 2016
American black metal musical groups
American doom metal musical groups
Musical quartets
American post-metal musical groups
Musical groups from Portland, Oregon
1995 establishments in Oregon
2016 disestablishments in Oregon
Profound Lore Records artists